Butaleja District is a district in Eastern Uganda. It is named after its 'chief town', Butaleja, where the district headquarters are located.

Location
Butaleja District is bordered by Budaka District to the north, Mbale District to the east, Tororo District to the southeast, Bugiri District to the south and Namutumba District to the west. The coordinates of the district are:00 56N, 33 57E.

Overview
Butaleja District was created by Act of the Ugandan Parliament, and became operational on 1 July 2005. Prior to that the district was known as Bunyole County and was part of Tororo District. The predominant ethnicity in the district (85%) are Banyole, a Bantu tribe whose language is called Lunyole. Lunyole has been listed by the Institute of Languages of Makerere University among the endangered minority languages in Uganda. The main food of the Banyole is a finger millet meal called Obusiima. The traditional official meal included Obusiima and mushroom sauce.

Other ethnicities in the district (15%) include the Jopadhola, the Bagisu, the Basoga, the Iteso, the Karimojong and the Bagwere. Due to a high population density in the district, environmental degradation is a concern.

There are two municipalities in the district; Butaleja, where the district headquarters are located and Busolwe, the location of Busolwe General Hospital, a 100-bed public hospital, administered by the Uganda Ministry of Health.

Population
In 1991, the national population census estimated the district population at about 106,700. The national census in 2002 estimated the population of the district at about 157,500. The annual population growth rate in the district was 3.5%. In 2012, the population of Butaleja District was approximately 221,100.

The table below illustrates the growth trajectory of the district population between 2002 and 2012. All numbers are estimates.

Economic activities
Like in most of Uganda's districts, subsistence agriculture is the backbone of the district economy. Crops grown include:

Livestock kept by the population include:

See also
 Butaleja
 Eastern Region, Uganda
 Districts of Uganda
Busolwe General Hosptital

References

External links
  Butaleja District: From Troubling Starvation to Top Rice Producer

 
Districts of Uganda
Eastern Region, Uganda